This article list the results of mixed doubles category in the 2007 BWF World Championships (World Badminton Championships).

Seeds

Draw

Finals

Top half

Section 1

Section 2

Bottom half

Section 3

Section 4

Source 
Tournamentsoftware.com: 2007 World Championships - Mixed doubles

- Mixed doubles, 2007 Bwf World Championships
World Championships